Sandokan to the Rescue (Italian: Sandokan alla riscossa) is a 1964 historical adventure film directed by Luigi Capuano and starring Ray Danton, Guy Madison and Franca Bettoia. It was made as a co-production between Italy and West Germany. It is based on the 1907 novel Sandokan to the Rescue by Emilio Salgari featuring the character of Sandokan a Malayan pirate.

The film's sets were designed by the art director Giancarlo Bartolini Salimbeni and Massimo Tavazzi.

Cast
 Ray Danton as Sandokan
 Guy Madison as Yanez 
 Franca Bettoia as Samoa 
 Mario Petri as William Drook 
 Alberto Farnese as Tremal Naik 
 Mino Doro as Lumbo 
 Giulio Marchetti as Sagapar 
 Sandro Moretti as Kammamuri 
 Ferdinando Poggi as Teotokris' Complice 
 Raf Baldassarre as Teotrokis the Greek 
 Isarco Ravaioli as Sitar

References

Bibliography 
 Goble, Alan. The Complete Index to Literary Sources in Film. Walter de Gruyter, 1999.

External links 
 

1964 films
Italian historical adventure films
1960s historical adventure films
West German films
German historical adventure films
1960s Italian-language films
Films directed by Luigi Capuano
Films set in the 19th century
Films based on the Indo-Malaysian cycle
1960s Italian films
1960s German films
Italian-language German films